The Mayor of Monza is an elected politician who, along with the Monza's City Council, is accountable for the strategic government of Monza in Lombardy, Italy. 

The current Mayor is Paolo Pilotto (PD) who took office on 28 June 2022.

Overview
According to the Italian Constitution, the Mayor of Monza is member of the City Council.

The Mayor is elected by the population of Monza, who also elects the members of the City Council, controlling the Mayor's policy guidelines and is able to enforce his resignation by a motion of no confidence. The Mayor is entitled to appoint and release the members of his government.

Since 1997 the Mayor is elected directly by Monza's electorate: in all mayoral elections in Italy in cities with a population higher than 15,000 the voters express a direct choice for the mayor or an indirect choice voting for the party of the candidate's coalition. If no candidate receives at least 50% of votes, the top two candidates go to a second round after two weeks. The election of the City Council is based on a direct choice for the candidate with a preference vote: the candidate with the majority of the preferences is elected. The number of the seats for each party is determined proportionally.

Republic of Italy (since 1946)

City Council election (1946-1997)
From 1946 to 1997, the Mayor of Monza was elected by the City Council.

Direct election (since 1997)
Since 1997, under provisions of new local administration law, the Mayor of Maonza is chosen by direct election every five years.

References

External links
 
 

Monza
Mayors of Monza
Politics of Lombardy
Monza